Maradun is a Local Government Area in Zamfara State, Nigeria. Its headquarters are in the town of Maradun  towards the south of the Area.

It had an area of 2,728 km and a population of 210,852 at the 2006 census.
 
The postal code of the area is 881.

References

Local Government Areas in Zamfara State